John Swett (July 31, 1830 – August 22, 1913) is considered to be the "Father of the California public school" system and the "Horace Mann of the Pacific".

Biography
John Swett was an only child born July 31, 1830 in Pittsfield, New Hampshire, to Lucretia (born French) Swett and Ebenezer Swett, who were Congregationalists. He died August 22, 1913 in Alhambra Valley, near Martinez, California. He married Mary Louise (Tracy) Swett on May 8, 1862 in Sonoma, and they had 6 children.  During his life he was a close friend of Sierra Club co-founder John Muir.  Swett arrived in California in 1853 to mine gold but quickly sought work as a teacher in San Francisco. In 1862 he became a Freemason, joining San Francisco's Phoenix Lodge No. 144.

In 1863 he was instrumental in founding the California Educational Society, which would become the California Teachers Association, the largest teachers' union in the state of California.  Running in 1863, during the Civil War, as a National Union Party (Republican) candidate he was elected California State Superintendent of Public Instruction and served until 1867.  Other positions he held were Deputy Superintendent of the San Francisco Public Schools (1870–1873), Principal of the Denman School (1873–1876) and Girls High School (San Francisco) (1876–1889); the School Board there was dissatisfied with his administration because he had taken no steps toward its accreditation by the University of California and because no women had been sent to the university since 1884.

In 1890 he was elected superintendent of the San Francisco Public Schools on the Republican and Reform Democratic tickets.

In 1895 he retired to his estate, Hill Girt Ranch.

California State Superintendent of Public Instruction (1863-1867)
His most important accomplishment was making the California school system free for all students.  In his report for 1866–67, he stated:  "The school year ending June 30, 1867, marks the transition period of California from rate-bill common schools to an American free school system.  For the first time in the history of the State, every public school was made entirely free for every child to enter."

Criticism
In his 1878 book The Poison Fountain Zachariah Montgomery criticized, among other things, Swett's autocratic style.  He states the following on page 111:
It must be remembered that Superintendent Swett maintains the proposition that parents have no remedy against the teachers, and that:
"As a general thing the only persons who have a legal right to give orders to the teacher are his employers, namely, the committee in some States, and in others the directors or trustees. If his conduct is approved by his employers the parents have no remedy as against him or them." (See Swett's Biennial Report, 1864, page 166.)

And we must not forget that this same superintendent has said that: " The vulgar impression that parents have a legal right to dictate to teachers is entirely erroneous."

In his 1876 book, History of the Public School Systems of California, Swett becomes one of the first Californian educators to specify that mature children actually belong to the state or society, writing:

"Children arrived at the age of maturity belong, not to the parents, but to the State, to society, to the country."

Tributes
John Swett Award for Media Excellence, awarded yearly by the California Teachers Association
John Swett High School in Crockett, California
John Swett Elementary School in Martinez, CA
John Swett Unified School District in Contra Costa County, California
On the day of his funeral (August 25, 1913), nearly every school in California closed in honor of Swett.

Books and other works
His papers have been donated by his children to the Bancroft Library at the University of California, Berkeley: Guide to the John Swett Papers, 1853-1913, Bancroft Library Staff, University of California, Berkeley
Also donated to the Bancroft Library were the papers of the Tracy family (Swett's wife's family): Tracy family papers (ca. 1800-1888), Collection Number: BANC MSS Z-Z 107
History of the Public School System of California, by John Swett
Methods of Teaching, by John Swett

See also
George H. Atkinson, Founder of the Oregon Public school system

References

External links

 
Mountain View People webpage describing John Swett's grave site at Mountain View Cemetery (Oakland, California).  He is interred with his daughter Helen Swett Artieda and her husband Gregorio Artieda.
"Early Vision of Semple, Swett Realized in Broad, Firm Educational System", by Will C. Wood, State Superintendent of Public Instruction
"John Swett and the Politics of Public Education in Frontier California", by Ruth E. Sutter
"John Swett (1830-1913)", JiffyNotes.com
The Bay of San Francisco, Vol. 2, Pages 526-527, Lewis Publishing Co, 1892. (San Francisco County Biographies, Genealogy.com)
"John Swett, Public Education in California" (New York: American Books, 1911) (from http://www.encyclopedia.com)
John Swett's entry in various editions of Who's Who:
Who's Who in America, Volume 3, edited by John William Leonard, Albert Nelson Marquis
Who's Who in America
A Yankee Patriot: John Swett, the Horace Mann of the Pacific Nicholas C. Polos History of Education Quarterly Vol. 4, No. 1 (Mar., 1964), pp. 17-32 

1830 births
1913 deaths
People from Pittsfield, New Hampshire
Politicians from San Francisco
California Superintendents of Public Instruction
American education writers
American educational theorists
Schoolteachers from California
American trade union leaders
Labor relations in California
People of the California Gold Rush
History of California
People from Alhambra, California
19th-century American politicians
Activists from California
Activists from New Hampshire
American Freemasons
American school principals